Galanis is a surname. Notable people with the surname include:

 Demetrios Galanis (1879–1966), Greek artist 
 Dimitrios Galanis (born 1971), Greek basketball coach
 James Galanis, football manager
 John Peter Galanis (born 1943), American financier and convicted fraudster
 Theodoros Galanis (born 1980), Greek footballer
 Vasilios Galanis (born 1987), Greek footballer

See also
 Galani

Greek-language surnames
Surnames